The Wisconsin Northern Railroad  is the trade name employed by Progressive Rail to operate  of railroad in northern Wisconsin and began operations on November 29, 2004.

Trackage 
The railroad operates on trackage leased from the Union Pacific Railroad (UP) and Wisconsin Central Limited (WC). The UP trackage extends north from Norma, a junction with the UP in northern Chippewa Falls, to Cameron. It was completed by the Chippewa Falls and Northern Railway, a predecessor of the Chicago and North Western Railway, in 1883.

At Cameron, the Wisconsin Northern splits, with WC trackage continuing north to Rice Lake and west to Almena. The Rice Lake line was opened by the Rice Lake, Dallas and Menomonie Railway in 1894, and the Almena line by the Minneapolis, Sault Ste. Marie and Atlantic Railway in 1884. Both became part of the Minneapolis, St. Paul and Sault Ste. Marie Railroad (Soo Line), and were spun off to the WC in 1987.

Major commodities 
In the past, traffic consisted of shipments of resins, scrap materials, lumber, logs, fertilizer, steel, feed grade grains, and tallow. However, in December 2011, EOG Resources opened an online sand processing plant. Sand now represents over 90% of the shipments, with the railroad hauling an estimated 160,000 tons of sand per month. This volume of traffic has required a total rebuilding of much of the trackage as well as construction of new interchange and car staging yards. This new booming mining business, while making the Wisconsin Northern quite profitable, has also killed the railroad's hopes of expanding its trackage rights. Progressive Rail had planned to contract with the state of Wisconsin to operate a 45-mile extension that would have connected the Wisconsin Northern with the Canadian National mainline, however when the CN discovered the booming Wisconsin sand market, they backed out of the sale of the rail line they had attempted to previously abandon.

Equipment 
The railroad's locomotive roster is on loan from parent Progressive Rail and includes one EMD SW1500, two EMD GP15-1s, an EMD SD38-2, and two new EMD SD40M-2s.  units operating along the system.

See also 
 List of United States railroads
 List of Wisconsin railroads
 Progressive Rail, Inc.

References

External links 
 Progressive Rail, Inc. - Official parent company website
 Railroad Picture Archives - Photographs of the Wisconsin Northern Railroad

Wisconsin railroads
Spin-offs of the Canadian National Railway
Spin-offs of the Union Pacific Railroad
Railway companies established in 2004